Dyson was a Unix general-purpose operating system derived from Debian using the illumos kernel, libc, and SMF init system.

Dyson was built from scratch to be as similar to Debian as possible, i.e. most of Debian packages should build on Dyson without changes, and architecture-independent packages (arch all in Debian terms) should be installable without modification.

Features
 ZFS, Solaris Containers, IPFilter, Dtrace, OpenSolaris Network Virtualization and Resource Control (also known as Crossbow)
 Advanced Packaging Tool and many packages and configuration facilities, including developer (automated, testing) tools.

See also

 StormOS (obsolete)
 StormOS information, screenshot, download, etc. (archived)

References

External links
 Dyson site

Debian
Debian-based distributions
OpenSolaris
Linux distributions